Amirkabir University of Technology (AUT), also called the Tehran Polytechnic, is a public technological university located in Tehran, Iran. Founded in 1928, AUT is the second oldest technical university established in Iran.

It is referred to as the 'Mother of Engineering Universities'. Acceptance to the university is competitive, entrance to undergraduate and graduate programs requiring scoring among the top 1% of students in the Iranian University Entrance Exam, known as 'Konkour'.

The university was founded in 1928 as a technical academy, and was further developed into a full-fledged university by Habib Nafisi in 1956, after that it was extended and enlarged by Dr. Mohammad Ali Mojtahedi, during the Pahlavi dynasty. Named the Tehran Polytechnic, it initially offered five engineering degrees, namely; Electrical and Electronics, Mechanical, Textile, Chemistry and Construction and Infrastructure. Six months before the victory of 1979 Iranian Revolution, Tehran Polytechnic was renamed after the Iranian prime minister Amir Kabir (1807–1852).

The university now has 18 science and engineering departments, dozens of research groups and laboratories and three other affiliated centers, located in Garmsar, Bandar Abbas and Mahshahr. Around 13,400 students are enrolled in the undergraduate and graduate programs. AUT has more than 500 full-time academic faculty members and 550 administrative employees, giving it the highest staff-to-student ratio among the country's universities. The executive branch consists of four departments which receive participation from councils in planning and administering affairs.

AUT has signed agreements with international universities for research and educational collaboration. There is a joint program between AUT and the University of Birmingham.

AUT is one of the leading universities in E-Learning systems in Iran which began its activities in 2004.

AUT is the pioneer of sustainable development in Iran and established the Office of Sustainability in 2011. The activities of this office contribute to the AUT campus by reducing energy consumption, costs, and emissions, and also provide student coursework, volunteer opportunities for students, as well as research and education academic activities on sustainable development.

History
The establishment and formation of the Amirkabir University of Technology dates back to October 1956 by Eng. Habib Nafisi. The core of the university was formed at that time under the name Tehran Polytechnic in order to expand the activities of two technical institutes: the Civil Engineering Institute and the Higher Art Center. After Habib Nafisi, the founder of Tehran polytechnic, Dr. Abedi, became the president of the university for a few months until Dr. Mohammad Ali Mojtahedi, the principal at the renowned Alborz High School, was appointed as president of the university early in 1963. Among the accomplishments of Dr. Mojtahedi is the construction of a central amphitheatre, a dining area and a sports ground as well as various faculty buildings.

The university has grown into a national center of science and engineering and its undergraduates number more than 7,000, with a further 6,400 graduate students. The university boasts 35 undergraduate majors, around 90 M.Sc. majors and 36 Ph.D. and post-doctoral programs.

Rankings and reputation

Amirkabir University has been consistently ranked as one of Iran's top universities. The 2011 QS World University Rankings ranked the university 301–350 in Engineering and Technology in the world. Iran's Ministry of Science, Research and Technology ranked AUT among the Top 3 high ranked universities in the country. In Webometrics Ranking of World Universities (2012), the university also ranks among the top three highest ranked universities in Iran. Computer Science, Polymer Engineering and Biomedical Engineering have the highest field rankings in Amirkabir University of Technology.

In the 2013 Shanghai Rankings Amirkabir University's Computer Science department ranked 100–150 among World Universities. In 2014, the Shanghai ranking placed Amirkabir University's Engineering Sciences 151–200 among World Universities. The Polymer Engineering Department of Amirkabir University of Technology is the first and most prestigious Polymer Engineering program in Iran. AUT also ranked first among Iranian universities in 2014 in the CWTS Leiden Ranking.  In 2014, the U.S. News & World Report ranked Amirkabir University of Technology's Engineering Sciences 89 among world universities. Also, Computer Science of AUT ranked 90 among World Universities.

The 2021 edition of the QS World University Rankings placed Amirkabir University 477th in the world and second in Iran with an overall score of 24.8, behind only Sharif University of Technology which stood at 407th.

Campuses

Tehran

The main campus of the Amirkabir University of Technology is in Tehran, Iran. It is located close to Vali Asr Crossroads, the intersection of Enghelab Street and Vali Asr Street, in the very center of Tehran City. Many students commute to AUT via the subway by Vali Asr station.

Mahshahr
The Mahshar campus of AUT has been constructed in the province of Khouzestan in 2001 in order to establish close cooperation with the national company of petroleum industries.

Bandar Abbas
The Bandar Abbas campus of AUT has been established in the province of Hormozgan, which is the center of marine industries in Iran.

Garmsar
The Garmsar campus of AUT has been constructed in the province of Semnan in order to establish close cooperation and distance with the main campus in Tehran.

Library
The library and document center at AUT, the largest technical and engineering library in Iran's capital, is one of the richest academic libraries in the technical and engineering field in the region. The library includes a central library and 16 satellite libraries in Tehran and Bandar Abbas. The library houses about 5 million books.

Departments
AUT has 16 departments including 'management, science and technology', electrical engineering, biomedical engineering, polymer engineering, mathematics and computer science, chemical engineering, industrial engineering, civil and environmental engineering, physics and energy engineering, computer and information technology, mechanical engineering, mining and metallurgical engineering, textile engineering, petroleum engineering, ship engineering, and aerospace engineering. AUT has three educational sites in Garmsar, Bandar Abbas and Mahshahr.

Scientific associations
Scientific associations exist to help students transform themselves into contributing members of the professional community. Course work develops only one range of skills. Other skills needed to flourish professionally include effective communication and personal interactions, leadership experience, establishing a personal network of contacts, presenting scholarly work in professional meetings and journals, and outreach services to the campus and local communities.

University association websites are as:
Scientific Association of Physics

Presidents
Habib Nafisi
Prof. Abedi
Prof. Mohammad Ali Mojtahedi
Prof. Bita
Prof. Yeganeh Haeri
Prof. Mohammad-Jafar Jadd Babaei
Prof. Kayvan Najmabadi
Prof. Hossein Mahban
Prof. Siroos Shafiei
Prof. Miri
Prof. Mahdi
Prof. Hasan Farid Alam
Prof. Kamaleddin Yadavar Nikravesh
Prof. Hassan Rahimzadeh
Prof. Aliakbar Ramezanianpour
Prof. Reza Hosseini Abardeh
Prof. Mohammad Hossein Salimi Namin
Prof. Abdolhamid Riazi
Prof. Ahmad Fahimifar
 Prof. Alireza Rahai (2005–2014)
 Prof. Ahmad Motamedi (2014–2021)
 Prof. Hassan Ghodsipour (acting) (2021–present)

Research and innovation
The university is known as a pioneer in research and innovation in Iran.  AUT is a public university, and the government of Iran partly provides its research funding. AUT has cooperation with industrial companies, especially in the oil and gas industries. As a result, many research projects in the university are funded by industrial companies.

The Amirkabir University of Technology was appointed as a Center of Excellence by Iran's Ministry of Science and Technology in the fields of Biomechanics, Power Systems, Radiocommunication systems (RACE) and Thermoelasticity.

The university houses a supercomputer which has a speed of 34,000 billion operations per second. The computer is available for both university affiliated as well as non-affiliated research.

Amirkabir Journal of Science and Technology is a scientific journal which publishes research achievements of academic and industrial researchers in all engineering and science areas.

The AUT Journal of Mathematics and Computing (AJMC) is a peer-reviewed journal that publishes original articles, review articles and short communications in all areas of mathematics, statistics and computer sciences.

Research and Technology Center of AUT is an office which collaborates with industries and universities in order to improve research level in the university.

Notable alumni and faculty

Science and technology
Abolhassan Astaneh-Asl, professor of civil engineering, University of California, Berkeley
Mohammad Reza Eslami, professor of mechanical engineering, one of the top 20 most cited scientists of Iran
Reza Iravani, professor of electrical engineering, University of Toronto
Mohammad Modarres, professor of mechanical and energy engineering, University of Maryland, College Park

Industry
Bahaedin Adab, co-founder of Karafarin Insurance Co. and Karafarin Bank, former deputy chairman of the board of director of the Industry Confederation of Iran, former chairman of the board of directors of the Syndicate of Construction Companies of Tehran
Hossein Hosseinkhani, Shareholder & Owner at Matrix, Inc., a world-leading biotech company dedicated to healthcare technology to improve patient's quality of life. New York City, US. Former chairman of the board of directors of the Pacific Stem Cells, Ltd.

Politics
Abbas Abdi, political activist
Bahaedin Adab, former member of parliament from Kurdistan (Sanandaj, Kamyaran, Divandareh), co-founder of the Kurdish United Front
Ali Afshari, political activist
Mohsen Mirdamadi, secretary general of Islamic Iran Participation Front, the largest reformist party in Iran
Mostafa Mirsalim, former minister of Islamic Culture and Guidance
Ahmad Motamedi, former minister of Communication and Information Technology
Behzad Nabavi, former minister of industry and former deputy speaker of the Parliament of Iran
Majid Tavakoli, prominent Iranian student leader, human rights activist and political prisoner
Ahmad Vahidi, former minister of defense
Ezzatollah Zarghami, former president of the Islamic Republic of Iran Broadcasting (IRIB), Iran's television and radio organization
 Farhad Nouri golpa, former president of students council, Screenplay writer, director

Other
Mohammad Ali Mojtahedi, former dean of the university
Davood Mirbagheri,  screenwriter and film director

News
Fars News Agency reports: "President of Iran's Amirkabir University of Technology Alireza Rahaei announced the country is preparing to put a new home-made satellite, called Nahid (Venus), into orbit in the next three months".

Cientifica reports in news item on Nanowerk, April 25, 2012: Iranian scientists are using lecithin to synthesize and bind silver nanoparticles more tightly to wool.

References

External links

AUT homepage
IBIMA – Iran Building Information Modeling Association

 
1928 establishments in Iran
Educational institutions established in 1928
1956 establishments in Iran
Educational institutions established in 1956